Rimella (Walser German: Remmalju, Piedmontese: Rimela) is a comune (municipality) in the Province of Vercelli in the Italian region Piedmont, located about  northeast of Turin and about  northwest of Vercelli.

Rimella borders the following municipalities: Bannio Anzino, Calasca-Castiglione, Cravagliana, Fobello, and Valstrona.

Population
Founded in 1255 by Walser emigrants from Visperterminen in the now Swiss Valais, its population is traditionally Alemannic German speaking. From 1871 on, when Rimella had a population of 1327, the number of inhabitants has dramatically diminished. As of 31 December 2004, it had a population of 129.

References

Sources
 Marco Bauen: Sprachgemischter Mundartausdruck in Rimella (Valsesia, Piemaont). Zur Syntax eines südwalserischen Dialekts im Spannungsfeld der italienischen Landes- und Kultursprache, Berne and Stuttgart 1978. – Translated into Italian in 1999 by Eugenio Vasina.
 Paolo Sibilla: Una comunità Walser delle Alpi. Strutture tradizionali e processi culturali, Florence 1980.
 Centro Studi Walser (Ed.): Ts Remmaljertittschu. Vocabolario Italiano – Tittschu, Turin 1995. Vocabolario Tittschu – Italiano, Borgosesia 2005.
 Centro Studi Walser (Ed.): Storia di Rimella in Valsesia, Ravenna 2004.
 Silke La Rose: Walser Recht ennetbirgen – Ein Beitrag zu Ursprung und Verlaufsbedingungen der Walserwanderung. Part II: Rimella und Alagna, in: Wir Walser 1 (2006) 7–17.
 Atlante Toponomastico del Piemonte Montano Nr. 31: Rimella. Ed. by the Università degli Studi di Torino and the Region of Piedmont. Turin 2007.

External links
Photos
Infos in English/Italian/German

Cities and towns in Piedmont